Liu Wenjie (born 1944) is a Chinese official who has been the Deputy Chairman of the China Council for the Promotion of International Trade since 1998.

References

1944 births
Living people
Chinese government officials
Date of birth missing (living people)